Margaret Dawn Anderson (born April 14, 1967) is a Canadian politician and former civil servant of Inuvialuit descent. She was appointed to the Senate of Canada on December 12, 2018.

Biography
Anderson was born in Tuktoyaktuk. A longtime civil servant in the territorial government of the Northwest Territories, she has worked for the departments of justice and health and social services, in areas such as social work, probation, parole, restorative justice and domestic violence.

Activity
In May 2022 together with two other senators Senator Anderson issued a report calling for a review of the convictions of 12 indigenous women, including the Quewezance sisters, and their exoneration.

References

Living people
Canadian civil servants
Canadian senators from the Northwest Territories
21st-century Canadian politicians
Women members of the Senate of Canada
Independent Canadian senators
Inuit politicians
Canadian Inuit women
Inuit from the Northwest Territories
Inuvialuit people
1960s births
21st-century Canadian women politicians